The Nokia 3 is a Nokia-branded entry-level Android smartphone designed and marketed by HMD Global. It was announced on 26 February 2017, a day before the Mobile World Congress started, along with the Nokia 6, Nokia 5, and Nokia 3310 (2017). The phone receives regular monthly security updates and runs stock Android. Nokia 3.1 and others released after Nokia 3.

Specifications

Hardware

The Nokia 3 has a polycarbonate back shell with a metal frame; a similar styling to the Nokia Lumia 925.

The Nokia 3 has a 5.0-inch LTPS IPS LCD display, MediaTek MT6737 system on a chip with a quad-core 1.3 GHz Cortex-A53 CPU, 2 GB of RAM, 16 GB of internal storage that can be expanded using a microSD card up to 256 GB, 2630 mAh Li-Ion battery, 8 MP rear camera with LED flash and 8 MP front-facing camera with auto-focus. It is available in silver white, matte black, tempered blue and copper white colours.

Software
The Nokia 3 launched with Android Noguat 7.1.1 and can be updated to Android Pie 9.0., In 2018 HMD Global stated all their first generation Nokia phones would have one more year of Android updates.

On December 20, 2018, HMD Global released a software update to Oreo 8.1. On June 3, 2019, HMD Global released the update to Pie 9.0.

Release 
The Nokia 3 was released in India on 13 June 2017. It was released in United Kingdom on 12 July 2017.

Reception 
The Nokia 3, just like the Nokia 1 and Nokia 2, received mixed reviews. James Peckam of TechRadar praised the phone's "solid build quality and premium design", remarkably low price and use of "stock Android”"software, while criticising the poor performance and battery life.

Andrew Hoyle of CNET also appreciated the device's cheap but good design and criticised its lack of processing power. TrustedReviews praised the "great software, low price and battery life that will get you through the day", while criticising the terrible performance, "bad display" and "unreliable camera".

References

3
Mobile phones introduced in 2017
Discontinued smartphones